Monroe Township is one of the twelve townships of Miami County, Ohio, United States.  The 2000 census found 15,339 people in the township, 6,118 of whom lived in the unincorporated portions of the township.

Geography
Located in the southern part of the county, it borders the following townships:
Concord Township - north
Staunton Township - northeast
Bethel Township - southeast
Vandalia - south
Butler Township, Montgomery County - southwest
Union Township - west

The city of Tipp City is located in eastern Monroe Township.

Name and history
It is one of twenty-two Monroe Townships statewide.

Government
The township is governed by a three-member board of trustees, who are elected in November of odd-numbered years to a four-year term beginning on the following January 1. Two are elected in the year after the presidential election and one is elected in the year before it. There is also an elected township fiscal officer, who serves a four-year term beginning on April 1 of the year after the election, which is held in November of the year before the presidential election. Vacancies in the fiscal officership or on the board of trustees are filled by the remaining trustees.

References

External links
County website

Townships in Miami County, Ohio
Townships in Ohio